The Mount Storm Wind Farm is located 120 miles west of Washington, D.C. in Grant County, West Virginia. The wind farm includes 132 Gamesa G80 wind turbines each with a two megawatt (MW) capacity along 12 miles of the Allegheny Front. Construction of the wind farm began in 2006 and the project is now fully operational, generating up to 264 MW of electricity for the mid-Atlantic power grid.

Nedpower Mount Storm, LLC is a joint venture between  Shell and Dominion Resources, founded in 2007.

History
Plans for the farm were first announced in 2001, when U.S. Wind Force filed for a permit with the West Virginia Public Service Commission to build a 166 turbine wind farm, which would have been the largest wind farm east of the Mississippi River. The project's backers hoped that the first turbines would be operational by late 2002 with the rest of the facility coming online in 2003, but opponents quickly raised objections, arguing that the project would threaten birds and diminish home values in the surrounding area.

In May 2002, the Public Service Commission approved U.S. Wind Force's permit application without any significant opposition.  The company also reached an agreement with the AFL-CIO to use union labor in the construction of the facility.  At the hearings for the permit, speakers in favor of the project included Walt Helmick, a member of the West Virginia Senate, Jeff Barger, the County Commissioner of Grant County, and Steve White a union leader.  A study by the U.S. Fish and Wildlife Service concluded that the project posed little danger to local birds, clearing the way for construction.

Electricity production

Turbine Losses (to fire) 

 (January 16, 2008)
 (January 7, 2015)
 (2018 *requires date verification and siting)

See also

Wind power in West Virginia
List of wind farms in the United States

References

External links
 Drone Video Footage of Mount Storm Wind Farm

Energy infrastructure completed in 2008
Buildings and structures in Grant County, West Virginia
Wind farms in West Virginia